This is a list of notable Malaysian politicians of Tamil origin, including original immigrants who obtained Malaysian citizenship and their Malaysian descendants. Entries on this list are demonstrably notable by having a linked current article or reliable sources as footnotes against the name to verify they are notable and define themselves either full or partial Indian origin, whose ethnic origin lie in India.

This list also includes emigrant Malaysian politicians of Indian origin and could be taken as a list of famous Malaysian politicians of Indian origin.

List

 
 Abdul Azeez Abdul Rahim
 Dr. Ali Hamsa
 Ananthan Somasundaram
 Andrew David
 Arul Kumar Jambunathan
 Charles Anthony Santiago
 D. R. Seenivasagam
 D. S. Ramanathan
 Danyal Balagopal Abdullah
 Devaki Krishnan
 Devamany S. Krishnasamy
 Devan Nair
 G. Saminathan
 G. Vadiveloo
 Ganabathy Rao @ Ganabatirau Veraman
 Ganga Nayar
 Gladwin Kotelawala
 Gobind Singh Deo
 Gopalakrishnan Subramaniam
 Gunarajah George
 Gunasekaran Palasamy
 Irwan Serigar Abdullah
 Jagdeep Singh Deo
 Janil Puthucheary
 John Fernandez
 John Aloysius Thivy
 Karpal Singh
 K. L. Devaser
 K. Parthiban
 K. Pathmanaban
 K. Sivalingam
 K. S. Nijhar
 Kamache A. Doray Rajoo
 Karuppaiya Muthusamy
 Kasthuriraani Patto
 Kesavan Subramaniam
 Krishnamoorthy Rajannaidu
 Kulasegaran Murugeson
 Kumaresan Arumugam
 Kumutha Rahman
 Mary Josephine Pritam Singh
 M. G. Pandithan
 M. Kayveas
 M. Manogaran
 M. Manoharan
 Manickam Letchuman
 Manikumar Subramaniam
 Manivannan Gowindasamy
 Michael Jeyakumar Devaraj
 N. Gobalakrishnan
 N. Surendran
 N. K. Menon
 Normala Abdul Samad
 Nor Mohamed Yakcop
 Palanivel K. Govindasamy
 P. Kamalanathan
 P. Patto
 Prabakaran Parameswaran
 Rajiv Rishyakaran
 Ramasamy Palanisamy
 Ramkarpal Singh
 Raven Kumar Krishnasamy
 Ravi Munusamy
 Reezal Merican Naina Merican
 RSN Rayer
 R. S. Thanenthiran
 S. Krishnasamy
 S. Manikavasagam
 S. Sothinathan
 Samy Vellu
 Santhara Kumar Ramanaidu
 Saravanan Murugan
 Satees Muniandy
 Shanmugam Ptcyhay 
 Sivanesan Achalingam
 Sivarajjh Chandran
 Sivarasa K. Rasiah
 Sivasubramaniam Athinarayanan
 Subramaniam Sathasivam
 Summugam Rengasamy
 Tanasekharan Autherapady
 Terence Naidu Raja Naidu
 V. Arumugam
 V. David
 V. Manickavasagam
 V. Sivakumar
 V. T. Sambanthan
 Veerappen Veerathan
 Veerapan Superamaniam
 Vidyananthan Ramanadhan
 Vigneswaran M. Sanasee
 Xavier Jayakumar Arulanandam
 Zambry Abdul Kadir
 S.O.K Ubaidullah

See also
 List of politicians of Indian descent#Malaysia

References

Indian descent
Malaysian politicians